Amazon Paint was a UNIX-based digital paint program produced by Interactive Effects, Inc. It featured 2D and 3D paint modes, 16-bit per channel color, layers, scripting, and a number of image processing filters. It was used to produce imagery for feature films, TV shows, and electronic entertainment titles throughout the 1990s and early 2000s. Amazon Paint has been superseded by Piranha.

Release history

Credits

Films
1994: Interview with the Vampire, The Santa Clause, True Lies
1995: 12 Monkeys, Apollo 13, Die Hard with a Vengeance, Judge Dredd, Outbreak, Species, Toy Story, Waterworld
1996: Black Sheep, The Nutty Professor
1997: Geri's Game
1998: The Prince of Egypt, A Bug's Life
1999: Fight Club, Galaxy Quest, The Haunting, The Matrix, Toy Story 2
2000: For the Birds, Hollow Man, Mission: Impossible 2, The Grinch
2001: Final Fantasy: The Spirits Within, Monsters, Inc., Moulin Rouge!, Shrek

Television
The X-Files
The Outer Limits

References

Raster graphics editors
IRIX software